Disanayake Mudiyanselage Rohana Kumara Dissanayake is a Sri Lankan politician, a member of the Parliament of Sri Lanka and a government minister.

References
 

Living people
Sri Lankan Buddhists
Members of the 13th Parliament of Sri Lanka
Members of the 14th Parliament of Sri Lanka
Members of the 16th Parliament of Sri Lanka
Government ministers of Sri Lanka
Sri Lanka Freedom Party politicians
United People's Freedom Alliance politicians
1958 births